The 21st Annual Japan Record Awards took place at the Imperial Garden Theater in Chiyoda, Tokyo, on December 31, 1979, starting at 7:00PM JST. The primary ceremonies were televised in Japan on TBS.

Award winners

Japan Record Award
Judy Ongg for "Miserarete"
 Lyricist: Yoko Aki
 Composer: Kyōhei Tsutsumi
 Arranger: Kyōhei Tsutsumi
 Record Company: CBS Sony Records

Best Vocalist
Sachiko Kobayashi for "Omoide Zake"

Best New Artist
Tomoko Kuwae for "Watashi No Heart Wa Stopmotion"

External links
Official Website

Japan Record Awards
Japan Record Awards
Japan Record Awards
Japan Record Awards
1979